Ogcocephalus vespertilio, the Brazilian batfish or seadevil, is a species of batfish. Its distribution includes the western Atlantic, from the Antilles to Brazil, more specifically on the coast of Brazil, occurring from the Amazon River to La Plata River This species grows to a length of  TL.

It lives on the ocean-floor, covered in sand. The fish are flat, resembling pancakes. It preys on bottom-dwelling invertebrates. 

These fish are nocturnal, and typically prey on other bottom-dwelling organisms in the early morning. The Brazilian Batfish stays stationary and hidden in rock holes and other small crevices during the day.  

While active, it searches for prey walking along the bottom with the help of its specialized paired fins, with the illicium protracted and oscillating or exploring the substrate. The prey are either snapped up from the bottom, after visual detection, or dug out with use of the mouth and rostrum. It feeds on crustaceans (hermit crabs, true crabs, shrimps, amphipods, porcelain crabs, isopods and mysid shrimps), molluscs (snails, sea slugs and clams), polychaete worms (mostly Errantia) and echinoderms (sea urchins and brittle stars). 

This species can be found in the aquarium trade.

References
 

Ogcocephalidae
Fish described in 1758
Taxa named by Carl Linnaeus